Economy of Georgia may refer to:
Economy of Georgia (country)
Economy of Georgia (U.S. state)